Salif Cissé (born 12 July 1992) is a French footballer who plays as a forward for Kapaz.

Career
Cissé started his career with French second division side Le Mans, where he made one league appearance and scored no goals.

In 2013, Cissé signed for Limoges in the French fifth division. In 2015, he signed for Democratic Republic of the Congo club DCMP In 2016, he signed for Belfort in the French third division after trialing for French second division team Sochaux. In 2018, Cissé signed for Athlético Marseille in the French fourth division.

Before the second half of 2018/19, he signed for French fourth division outfit Granville.

In 2020, he signed for Tsarsko Selo in the Bulgarian top flight.

On 25 January, he signed with the Lithuanian side, FC Hegelmann.

Personal life
Cissé  was born in France to a family with Malian origins, with two of his brothers – Kalifa and Ibrahima – who also embraced a professional footballing career.

References

External links
 
 

1992 births
Living people
Sportspeople from Dreux
French footballers
French sportspeople of Malian descent
Association football forwards
Expatriate footballers in Bulgaria
Expatriate footballers in the Democratic Republic of the Congo
Daring Club Motema Pembe players
Ligue 2 players
Le Mans FC players
FC Tsarsko Selo Sofia players
Botev Plovdiv players
Championnat National 3 players
Championnat National players
Limoges FC players
Luçon FC players
ASM Belfort players
Athlético Marseille players
US Granville players
Championnat National 2 players
Footballers from Centre-Val de Loire